Bernard Cecil Cohen (born February 22, 1926) is an American political scientist and educator who was acting Chancellor of University of Wisconsin–Madison in 1987.

Born in Northampton, Massachusetts, Cohen received his bachelors, masters, and doctorate degrees in political science from Yale University. Cohen became an original member of Princeton University's Center of International Studies and taught at Princeton from 1951 to 1959. Then, in 1959, Cohen taught at University of Wisconsin–Madison. He became chair of the political science department, dean of the graduate school, and then vice chancellor. In 1987, Cohen was acting chancellor of University of Wisconsin–Madison. In 1989, Cohen retired and lives in Madison, Wisconsin.

Notes

1926 births
Living people
People from Northampton, Massachusetts
Scientists from Madison, Wisconsin
Yale College alumni
Princeton University faculty
American political scientists
International relations scholars
University of Wisconsin–Madison faculty
Leaders of the University of Wisconsin-Madison
Yale Graduate School of Arts and Sciences alumni